Golledge is a surname. Notable people with the surname include:

 Andy Golledge, Australian country music singer and songwriter
 Les Golledge (1911–1989), English footballer
 Reginald Golledge (1937–2009), Australian-born American professor of geography